Yogi Vemana is a 1947 Telugu-language biographical film produced and directed by K. V. Reddy. The story is based on the life of saint poet Vemana. V. Nagayya played the role of Vemana and also composed music and sang many poems and songs in this film exposing his multifaceted talents.

Cast
 V. Nagayya as Vemana
 Mudigonda Lingamurthy as Abhirama
 M. V. Rajamma
 Doraiswamy
 Parvatibai
 Baby Krishnaveni as Jyoti
 Bezawada Rajarathnam
 B. Padmanabham

Crew
 Director: K. V. Reddy
 Screenplay: K. V. Reddy, Kamalakara Kameswara Rao
 Assistant Director: Kamalakara Kameswara Rao
 Dialogues and Songs: Samudrala Sr.
 Producer: K. V. Reddy
 Production Company: Vauhini Studios
 Original Music: V. Nagayya and Ogirala Ramchandra Rao
 Cinematography: Marcus Bartley
 Sound: A Krishnan
 Playback singers: V. Nagayya, M. V. Rajamma, Bezawada Rajarathnam, Ghantasala
 Choreographer: Vedantam Raghavayya

Songs
 "Amdalu Chimdeti Na Jyoti" (Lyricist: Samudrala; Singer: Nagayya; Music: Nagayya)
 "Aparani Tapamayera" (Lyricist: Samudrala; Singer: M. V. Rajamma and Ghantasala; Music: Nagayya)
 "Evari Nirmanamo" (Lyricist: Samudrala; Singer: Nagayya; Music: Nagayya)
 "Idena Imtena" (Lyricist: Samudrala; Singer: Nagayya; Music: Nagayya)
 "Jiva Himsa" (Lyricist: Samudrala; Singer: Nagayya; Music: Nagayya)
 "Kanupimchumura" (Lyricist: Samudrala; Singer: Nagayya; Music: Nagayya)
 "Manasa Mayanu Padaku" (Lyricist: Samudrala; Music: Nagayya)
 "Sevaka Jana" (Lyricist: Samudrala; Singer: M. V. Rajamma; Music: Nagayya)
 "Tadavayanika Levara" (Lyricist: Samudrala; Singer: Nagayya; Music: Nagayya)
 "Tadavayanika Levara" (Lyricist: Samudrala; Singer: M. V. Rajamma; Music: Nagayya)
 "Vadhalajalara" (Lyricist: Samudrala; Music: Nagayya)
 "Vachche Poye" (Lyricist: Samudrala; Music: Nagayya)
 "Veladulara" (Lyricist: Samudrala; Music: Nagayya)
 "Vamaa Padyamulu" (Lyricist: Vemana; Singer: Nagayya; Music: Nagayya)

References

External links
 
 A defining clip from the movie Yogi Vemana.

1947 films
1940s Telugu-language films
Indian biographical films
Indian black-and-white films
Films scored by Nagayya
Films scored by Ogirala Ramachandra Rao
Films directed by K. V. Reddy
1940s biographical films